The F2000 Championship Series is a North American–based open wheel road racing series based on Formula Continental, a wings and slicks series that is designed to be the second step after Formula F 1600.

The series utilizes the 2.0L powerplant of the new Mazda MZR engine or an older Zetec or Pinto engine coupled with chassis from companies such as Van Diemen, Citation, Mygale, RFR, Radon and Piper. Unlike other developmental series, there are no spec cars in F2000.

The series has existed in one form or another since the 1970s and the current championship has been in place since 2006 and was founded by a group of Sports Car Club of America racers as a pro series for SCCA Formula Continental club racers looking for more competition, and a proving ground for aspiring open wheel racers.

 2008 champion Anders Krohn has gone on to Star Mazda as has  2009 champion Chris Miller. In 2011 Krohn raced in Indy Lights against 2010 F2000 champion Victor Carbone.

In 2010, a revival of the previous series named the U.S. F2000 National Championship, intended for young aspiring professional drivers, began racing. It uses a similar specification of car and is sanctioned by IndyCar.  However, as that series now is a single-spec series, this series is a professional Formula Continental based series and is the second step, after the F1600 (the traditional Formula Ford).

Champions

See also
Formula Ford
U.S. F2000 National Championship

References

External links
 F2000 Championship Series – Official Site

 
Sports Car Club of America